Osceola Township is an inactive township in St. Clair County, in the U.S. state of Missouri.

Osceola Township was erected in 1841, taking its name from the community of Osceola, Missouri.

References

Townships in Missouri
Townships in St. Clair County, Missouri